Sivuch (Russian - Сивуч; "sealion") was a Gilyak-class gunboat of the Imperial Russian Navy. During World War I, she was sunk in the Gulf of Riga during the Battle of the Gulf of Riga on 19 August 1915 by the German battleships Nassau and Posen.

References

Bibliography
Chesneau, Roger, and Eugene M. Kolesnik, eds., Conway′s All the World′s Fighting Ships 1860-1905, New York: Mayflower Books, 1979, .
Gray, Randal, ed., Conway′s All the World′s Fighting Ships 1906-1921, Annapolis, Maryland: Naval Institute Press, 1985,

External links
Мореходная канонерская лодка "Сивуч" (Russian)

Gunboats of the Imperial Russian Navy
World War I gunboats
World War I naval ships of Russia
World War I shipwrecks in the Baltic Sea
Maritime incidents in 1915
1907 ships